Chew usually refers to chewing, the process by which food is crushed and ground by teeth. 

Chew may also refer to:

Places
 River Chew, in Somerset, England

Arts, entertainment, and media
 Chew (comics), an American comic book series
 Chew (film), an upcoming film
 The Chew, an American cooking-themed talk show

Other uses
 Chew (surname), a Chinese, English, and Korean surname (including a list of people with the surname)
 Chew, another name for taffy (candy)
 , a United States Navy destroyer

See also 

 Chewa (disambiguation)
 Chewing (Input Method)
 Chewing tobacco
 Choo (disambiguation)
 Choo Choo (disambiguation)
 Chow (disambiguation)
 CIU (disambiguation)